Lyonia may refer to:
 Lyonia (brachiopod), a fossil genus of brachiopods in the family Monticuliferidae
 Lyonia (plant), a genus of flowering plants in the family Ericaceae

 Lyonia (journal), a former journal on ecological research from the University of Hawaii